Brömsebro is a bimunicipal village situated in Karlskrona Municipality, Blekinge County and Torsås Municipality, Kalmar County in south-east Sweden with 213 inhabitants in 2005.

Two Dano-Swedish treaties were signed in Brömsebro: the First Treaty of Brömsebro (1541), which was a Dano-Swedish alliance against the Hanseatic League,
and the Second Treaty of Brömsebro (1645) ending the Torstenson War. The village was at that time situated on the border between Sweden and Denmark. It was also the venue of other diplomatic meetings and negotiations between Denmark and Sweden (see painting).

References

External links

Populated places in Karlskrona Municipality
Populated places in Torsås Municipality